"Help Me Believe" is a song by gospel/hip hop musician Kirk Franklin from his 2007 album, The Fight of My Life. It won the Grammy Award for "Best Gospel Song" at the 51st Grammy Awards in 2009.

References

2007 songs
Kirk Franklin songs
Songs written by Kirk Franklin